Dmitry Dolgopyat is a Russian-American mathematician at the University of Maryland known for his research in dynamical systems.

Biography 
He graduated from Moscow State School 57 mathematical class in 1989. From 1989 to 1994, he was an undergraduate student at Moscow State University. From 1994 to 1997, he was enrolled in Princeton University, where he earned a PhD under the guidance of Yakov Sinai.

He was an invited speaker at the 2006 International Congress of Mathematicians in Madrid.

In 2009, he was awarded the Michael Brin Prize in Dynamical Systems for his fundamental contributions to the theory of hyperbolic dynamics.

References 

Living people
Russian mathematicians
Moscow State University alumni
Princeton University alumni
University of Maryland, College Park faculty
Dynamical systems theorists
Year of birth missing (living people)